Otavio Sousa (born in Recife, Brazil) is a Brazilian Jiu Jitsu competitor. He is a black belt and competes for Gracie Barra, where he has won numerous championships. Souza is a three time black belt Brazilian jiu-jitsu world champion and ADCC silver medalist.

References

BJJ GI

External links
http://www.bjjheroes.com/bjj-fighters/otavio-sousa

Brazilian practitioners of Brazilian jiu-jitsu
People awarded a black belt in Brazilian jiu-jitsu
Living people
Year of birth missing (living people)
Sportspeople from Recife